Johannes "Jan" Verheijen (30 November 1896 – 29 April 1973) was a Dutch weightlifter who competed in the 1924 Summer Olympics and in the 1928 Summer Olympics. He was born and died in The Hague and was the brother of Hendrik and Minus Verheijen.

In 1924 he finished twelfth in the light-heavyweight class. Four years later he won the bronze medal in the light-heavyweight class of the 1928 Games.

References

External links
profile

1896 births
1973 deaths
Dutch male weightlifters
Olympic weightlifters of the Netherlands
Weightlifters at the 1924 Summer Olympics
Weightlifters at the 1928 Summer Olympics
Olympic bronze medalists for the Netherlands
Sportspeople from The Hague
Olympic medalists in weightlifting
Medalists at the 1928 Summer Olympics
20th-century Dutch people